Marilyn: An American Fable is a musical with a book by Patricia Michaels and music and lyrics by Jeanne Napoli, Doug Frank, Gary Portnoy, Beth Lawrence, and Norman Thalheimer.

History
Not to be confused with the West End production Marilyn! starring Stephanie Lawrence, this allegedly "authorized" version (officially endorsed by acting coach Lee Strasberg's wife Anna), while also based on events in the life of screen icon Marilyn Monroe, was a highly fictionalized account, complete with a happy ending, set on a huge, vacant Hollywood soundstage.

The production underwent numerous changes throughout its development period. During rehearsals, original star Geralyn Petchel was replaced by Alyson Reed in the role of Norma Jean/Marilyn Monroe, and Danielle DuClos was replaced by Kristi Coombs as Young Norma Jean. After previews began, director/choreographer Kenny Ortega was replaced by Thommie Walsh and Baayork Lee, although Ortega retained credit in the program. Ten musical numbers were dropped and forty-five minutes of dialogue were excised before opening night. Among the characters retained were young Norma Jean Baker, who interacted with her adult self, and a Greek chorus-like trio called Destiny, who provided a running commentary about the sex goddess's woes.

Production
The musical opened on Broadway on November 20, 1983 at the Minskoff Theatre, and closed on December 3, 1983, after only seventeen performances and 34 previews. In addition to Reed, the cast included Scott Bakula (making his Broadway debut) as Joe DiMaggio, Willie Falk (as Tommy), Will Gerard as Arthur Miller, and Kristi Coombs as young Norma Jean.

Reed was nominated for the 1984 Drama Desk Award for Outstanding Actress in a Musical.

Songs
Act I
SCENE 1: A SOUNDSTAGE, HOLLYWOOD LAND
 "We Are The Ones" – The Company
SCENE 2: UNDER THE HOLLYWOOD HILLS, 1934 – 1942
 "Close the Door, Norma" – Destiny
 "A Single Dream" – Young Norma Jean, Destiny
 "Jimmy Jimmy" – Destiny, Norma Jean, Babs, Jim, Pat, Ensemble
 "Church Doors" – Destiny
SCENE 3: THE PARACHUTE FACTORY, 1945
 "Miss Parachute" – Photographer, Madge, Elda, Dottie, Ramona, Virginia
SCENE 4: OVERSEAS
 "The Golden Dream" – Soldier
SCENE 5: AGENT'S HOME, HOLLYWOOD
 "Uh-Huh" – Agent
SCENE 6: STUDIO EXECUTIVE'S OFFICE

SCENE 7: THE SOUNDSTAGE, 1948 – 1953
 "Can't Keep My Heart From Racing" – Marilyn
 "Money, Men, And More" – Marilyn, Men
SCENE 8: A MOVIE BALCONY

SCENE 9: THE SOUNDSTAGE, 1955
 "I'll Send You Roses" – Joe, Marilyn
 "Church Doors" – Destiny
SCENE 10: MARILYN'S DRESSING ROOM 

SCENE 11: DIMAGGIO'S RESTAURANT
 "I'll Send You Roses" (Reprise) – Joe, Marilyn
SCENE 12: PREMIER NIGHT
 "It's A Premiere Night" – The Company
 "Stairway Leading Nowhere" – Marilyn
Act 2
SCENE 1: MARILYN'S BEDROOM
 "We'll Help You Through The Night" – Destiny
SCENE 2: SOUNDSTAGE
 "Shootin" – Marilyn, The Company
 "Run Between The Raindrops" – Marilyn
 "You Are So Beyond" – Tommy
SCENE 3: NEW YORK CITY, 1956 – 1960
 "In Disguise" – Marilyn, Arthur, Ensemble
 "A Special Man" – Destiny
 "Church Doors" – Destiny
SCENE 4: NEW YORK PENTHOUSE
 "Don't Hang Up The Telephone" – Joe, Marilyn
SCENE 5: NEW YORK TO HOLLYWOOD
 "All Roads Lead To Hollywood" – Marilyn, The Company
SCENE 6: SOUNDSTAGE
 "My Heart's An Open Door" – Marilyn, Joe
 "Miss Bubbles" – Marilyn, Men's Ensemble
 "A Single Dream" (Reprise) – Marilyn

Critical reception
In The New York Times, Frank Rich wrote "Marilyn is incoherent to the point of being loony. I defy anyone to explain - just for starters - why 10 chorus boys dressed in pink plumbers' costumes sing a song about bubble baths at the climax of Act II."

Awards and nominations

1984 Drama Desk Nomination
 Outstanding Actress in a Musical – Alyson Reed

Also see
Bombshell
Marilyn! the Musical

References

External links
 

1983 musicals
Cultural depictions of Marilyn Monroe
Cultural depictions of Joe DiMaggio
Works about Marilyn Monroe
Plays based on real people
Plays set in the 20th century